Montenegro competed at the 2013 Mediterranean Games in Mersin, Turkey from the 20 to 30 June 2013.

Montenegro was represented by women's handball team and 24 athletes in 11 individual sports.

Medalists

Archery 

Montenegro competed in archery.

Athletics 

Montenegro competed in athletics.

Bocce 

Montenegro competed in bocce.

Boxing 

Montenegro competed in boxing.

Handball 

Montenegro will be represented by women's team.
Women's Tournament - 1 team of 16 athletes

Judo 

Montenegro competed in judo.

Karate 

Montenegro competed in karate.

Sailing 

Men

Shooting 

Montenegro competed in shooting.

Swimming 

Montenegro competed in paralympic swimming.

Tennis 

Montenegro competed in tennis.

Wrestling 

Montenegro competed in wrestling.

References

External links

Nations at the 2013 Mediterranean Games
2013
Mediterranean Games